The Passionate Pianist is an Australian television film, or rather a live one-off television play, which aired in 1957 on ABC. This was part of ABC's twice monthly presentations of live plays during the late-1950s (one live play each month in Sydney and Melbourne, respectively, with most kinescoped for showing in the other city).

At the time, most one-off drama and comedy plays produced for Australian television were adaptations of overseas works, and The Passionate Pianist is notable as it represents an early example of a locally-written comedy for the medium.

Plot summary
Ben, the teenage son of a Sydney bookmaker prefers football to practicing piano. His mother (Marion Johns) is convinced he is a genius and enters him in an eistedford.

Cast
Mark Kelly as Ben
Marion Johns
Edward Howell
Ivor Bromley
Bruce A. Wishart

Play version
The Passionate Pianist was produced as a one act play. Barbara Vernon was a radio announcer in Inverell and wrote the play for Con Fardouly, a Greek who ran a cafe in Invernell.

It was first performed at the Inverell Town Hall, on 22 November 1957. The cast included Lee Jones, Nell Stewart, Frank Sloman, Rob Jeffs, and Con Fardouly.

It is part of the trilogy 'The Growing Year', which also includes Vernon's unpublished plays 'The Bishop and the Boxer' and 'First Love'.

Production
Rehearsals began in September 1957.

It is not known if the kinescope recording of the program still exists.

Radio Adaptation
The play was also adapted for radio.

Follow up
Barbara Vernon is also known for writing the play The Multi-Coloured Umbrella, which saw a television version in 1958. It was focused on the same family of Sydney book makers.

See also
Tomorrow's Child - One-off play on ABC, also during 1957
Ending It - One-off play on ABC, also during 1957
Take That - First Australian sitcom, 1957-1959
Bodgie - One-off play on ABC, aired in 1959
Blue Murder - One-off play on ABC, aired in 1959
List of live television plays broadcast on Australian Broadcasting Corporation (1950s)

References

External links
The Passionate Pianist at IMDb
Passionate Pianist at AustLit

1957 television plays
1950s Australian television plays
Australian Broadcasting Corporation original programming
English-language television shows
Black-and-white Australian television shows
Australian live television shows
Films about pianos and pianists